Vexillum creatum is a species of small sea snail, marine gastropod mollusk in the family Costellariidae, the ribbed miters.

Description
The length of the shell attains 13.1 mm.

Distribution
This marine species was found off Exmouth Gulf (north end), Western Australia.

References

 Marrow M.P. (2019). Seven new species of Vexillum (Gastropoda: Costellariidae) from Western Australia. Acta Conchyliorum. 19: 77–94.

creatum
Gastropods described in 2019
Gastropods of Australia